AIME may refer to:

 American Institute of Mining, Metallurgical, and Petroleum Engineers
 American Invitational Mathematics Examination, a selective mathematics test used to determine people who can compete in the United States of America Mathematical Olympiad
 Australian Indigenous Mentoring Experience, of which Jeff McMullen was a director for 15 years 
 Average Indexed Monthly Earnings (OASDI) for Social Security in the United States

Other
Aime, settlement in France
Aime (service), an online service by Sega

See also 

, including people with forename Aimé